The 2017 Belarusian Super Cup was held on 11 March 2017 between the 2016 Belarusian Premier League champions BATE Borisov and the 2015–16 Belarusian Cup winners Torpedo-BelAZ Zhodino. BATE won the match 3–1 and won the trophy for the seventh time.

Match details

See also
2016 Belarusian Premier League
2015–16 Belarusian Cup

References

Belarusian Super Cup
2010s in Minsk
Super
Belarusian Super Cup 2017
Belarusian Super Cup
Sports competitions in Minsk